80 Steps to Jonah is a 1969 American drama film directed by Gerd Oswald, written by Frederick Louis Fox, and starring Wayne Newton, Jo Van Fleet, Keenan Wynn, Diana Ewing, Mickey Rooney and Sal Mineo. It was released by Warner Bros. in December 1969.

Plot
Mark Jonah Winters (Wayne Newton) is a migrant worker who hitches a ride with Jerry Taggart (Sal Mineo). A car crash kills Taggert, and when the police arrive on the scene Jonah learns he had been riding in a stolen car. He is accused of car theft and, since he believes he cannot prove his innocence, he flees before he can be arrested.

Jonah spends the night sleeping in a field, and awakes to find four blind children, staying at a nearby  blind camp. He meets camp housekeeper Nonna (Jo Van Fleet) and camp director Tracy (Diana Ewing), who believe him to be the handyman they were expecting. Jonah begins working at the camp, and gains the trust of the children, whom he can relate to because he had been orphaned as a child. Nonna sees a photo of Jonah in the newspaper and, though she knows he is wanted by the police, does not turn him in.

Eventually the police arrive at the camp, and arrest Jonah. At the police station a drunkard named Wilfred Bashford (Mickey Rooney), who had spoken to Jonah just before he was given a ride by Taggert, is able to corroborate that Jonah had not been the driver of the stolen car. Jonah is freed, and returns to his friends at the camp.

Cast 
Wayne Newton as Mark Jonah Winters
Jo Van Fleet as Nonna
Keenan Wynn as Barney Glover
Diana Ewing as Tracy Rutledge
Mickey Rooney as Wilfred Bashford
Sal Mineo as Jerry Taggart
R. G. Armstrong as Mackray
Slim Pickens as Scott
Frank Schuller as Witney
Dennis Cross as Maxon
Brandon Cruz as Little Joe Wilson
Erin Moran as Kim
Teddy Quinn as Richard
Michele Tobin as Cathy
Susan Mathews as Velma
Ira Angustain as Pepe
Lilly Martens as Nina
Butch Patrick as Brian Hofstadter
Lord Nelson as Ralph the Dog
Coby Denton as Wilks
Joe Conley as Jenkins
Fred Dale as Sheriff
Don Familton as Sheriff
Holger Bendixen as Fisherman
James Bacon as Hobo
Jackie Kahane as himself

See also
 List of American films of 1969

References

External links 
 
 

1969 films
1960s English-language films
Warner Bros. films
American drama films
1969 drama films
Films directed by Gerd Oswald
Films about summer camps
1960s American films